The Taj Tashi is a hotel in Thimphu, Bhutan. Opened in 2008, the hotel is the first five-star hotel in Bhutan. The hotel is a joint venture of Indian hotel giant, Taj Leisure Hotels and local Tashi group. The hotel also hosts a conference space.

References

Taj Hotels Resorts and Palaces
Hotels in Thimphu
Hotels established in 2008
2008 establishments in Bhutan